Polyhalogenated compounds (PHCs) are any compounds with multiple substitutions of halogens.  They are of particular interest and importance because they bioaccumulate in humans, and comprise a superset of which has many toxic and carcinogenic industrial chemicals as members.  PBDEs, PCBs, dioxins (PCDDs) and PFCs are all polyhalogenated compounds.  They are generally non-miscible in organic solvents or water, but miscible in some hydrocarbons from which they often derive.

Uses
PHCs are used in a vast array of manufactured products, from wood treatments to cookware coatings, to non-stick, waterproof, and fire-resistant coatings, cosmetics, medicine, electronic fluids, food containers, and wrappings, in everything from furniture and furnishings, automobiles, airplanes, plastics, clothing and cloth, surgery, insulation, adhesives, paints, sealants, lubricating oils, polyurethane foams, cancer therapy, and medical imaging.  They are also heavily used in pest control.

Safety
PHCs include notoriously dangerous substances, including Agent Orange, DDT, and other pesticides.  Many non-pesticide PHCs have the same safety issues as pesticides.

Types
 Polycholorinated, e.g. PCBs, dioxins (PCDDs), hexachlorophene, dibenzofurans (PCDFs), polychloro phenoxy phenols (PCPPs), polychlorinated diphenyl ethers (PCDEs).
 Polybrominated, e.g., PBDEs, polybrominated biphenyls (PBBs).
 Perfluorinated compounds
 Polyiodinated compounds

Breakdown of compounds
Despite bioaccumulating in humans, patents have been filed for removal of halogen by electrolysis during manufacturing, though toxic chlorinated compounds may be created as byproducts of chlorinated compounds.  Another method during manufacture is to use anaerobic bacteria

References

Organohalides